This is a list of Idaho Vandals football players in the NFL Draft.

Key

Selections

Notes
 Ken Hobart was selected in the 1984 NFL Supplemental Draft, but never reported to an NFL team.

References

Idaho

Idaho Vandals NFL Draft